Štědrá is a municipality and village in Karlovy Vary District in the Karlovy Vary Region of the Czech Republic. It has about 500 inhabitants.

Administrative parts
Villages and hamlets of Brložec, Domašín, Lažany, Mostec, Prohoř, Přestání and Zbraslav are administrative parts of Štědrá.

References

Villages in Karlovy Vary